Ishibashi (written:  lit. "stone bridge") is a Japanese surname. Notable people with the surname include:

, Japanese sailor
Anna Ishibashi (born 1992), Japanese model and actress
Brittany Ishibashi (born 1980), American actress
, Japanese swimmer
Eiko Ishibashi, Japanese musician
Kaoru Ishibashi (born 1975) also known as Kishi Bashi, is a singer, instrumentalist, and songwriter
Katsuhiko Ishibashi (born 1944), Japanese professor and seismologist
, Japanese Vice-Admiral
Ishibashi Ningetsu (1865–1926), Japanese author
Manabu Ishibashi (born 1992), Japanese cyclist
Masashi Ishibashi (石橋雅史, 1933–2018), Japanese actor and a martial artist
, Japanese politician
Naoki Ishibashi (born 1981), former Japanese football player
Paula Ishibashi (born 1985), Brazilian rugby union player
Ryo Ishibashi (born 1956), Japanese actor
Shizuka Ishibashi (born 1994), Japanese actress and dancer
Sachio Ishibashi, professional shogi player
Shōjirō Ishibashi (1889–1976), Japanese businessman and founder of Bridgestone
Takaaki Ishibashi, (born 1961), Japanese actor/singer
Tanzan Ishibashi (1884–1973), 55th Prime Minister of Japan
Yoshimasa Ishibashi (born 1968), Japanese artist
Yoshimi Ishibashi (born 1949), Japanese race car driver
, Japanese field hockey player
Yūko Ishibashi (born 1980), Japanese singer

Japanese-language surnames